BFSP1 is a gene that encodes the protein filensin ("beaded filament structural protein 1") in humans.

More than 99% of the vertebrate ocular lens is made up of terminally differentiated lens fiber cells.  Two lens-specific intermediate filament proteins, phakinin (also known as CP49) and the protein product of this gene, filensin (or CP115), are expressed only after fiber cell differentiation has begun. Both proteins are found in a structurally unique cytoskeletal element that is referred to as the beaded filament (BF).

The two BFSP proteins are put into a "type VI" of intermediate filament (IF) classification. Unlike other IFs that form unbranched links, the two proteins form a network of filaments together with CRYAA.

References

External links

Further reading